Sandra White (born 17 August 1951) is a retired Scottish National Party (SNP) politician. She was a Member of the Scottish Parliament (MSP) for the Glasgow electoral region from 1999 until 2011, and then the MSP for the Glasgow Kelvin constituency from 2011 until she stood down from the Scottish Parliament at the May 2021 election.

Political career

White served as an SNP councillor in Renfrewshire. She contested Glasgow Kelvin in 1999, where she came second to the Labour Party candidate by 4,408 votes, but was elected to the Scottish Parliament on the Glasgow regional list. She was re-elected in 2003, topping the SNP's list of candidates for that region. Contesting Glasgow Kelvin that year she again came second to Labour, this time by the smaller margin of 3,289 votes.

White was re-elected on the regional list in 2007. In the 2011 election, she again contested the Glasgow Kelvin seat, this time defeating the sitting Labour MSP Pauline McNeill by 882 votes. White served as an SNP Parliamentary group whip in the first parliamentary session and sat on the parliament's Public Petitions Committee and Equal Opportunities Committee.

White holds her party's Deputy Social Justice portfolio. Her campaigns include against closures and downgrading (including a 1,600 signature petition) at the Royal Hospital for Sick Children, Yorkhill and the Queen Mother's Hospital. She has also campaigned against racism and for improved treatment of asylum seekers, including joining an occupation against 'dawn raids'.

Her other campaigns have included the successful attempts to save the 7:84 theatre group from threatened loss of funding by the Scottish Arts Council and involvement in Stop the War Coalition events, while high-profile constituency work has included the August 2006 case of an 86-year-old widow who was threatened with court by Glasgow Housing Association.

In August 2020, White announced that she would not be standing for re-election at the upcoming Holyrood election.

Controversies 
In November 2015 White re-tweeted an anti-semitic cartoon showing piglets suckling a large pig with the word “Rothschild” written on it and showing a bank with a Star of David. The tweet had originally been sent by a Twitter user who had repeatedly posted antisemitic messages and images. After The Jewish Chronicle brought the tweet to the attention of the SNP, the party's spokesperson said the tweet had been re-tweeted in error, and had since been deleted.

Personal life 
White was born on 17 August 1951 to Elizabeth Rodgers and Henry Harley. She married David White in 1971, and has two sons and one daughter. Her interests outside politics are walking, reading and gardening.

References

External links 
 
 SNP website
 theyworkforyou.com

1951 births
Living people
Antisemitism in Scotland
Scottish National Party MSPs
Members of the Scottish Parliament 1999–2003
Members of the Scottish Parliament 2003–2007
Members of the Scottish Parliament 2007–2011
Members of the Scottish Parliament 2011–2016
Members of the Scottish Parliament 2016–2021
Members of the Scottish Parliament for Glasgow constituencies
Female members of the Scottish Parliament
20th-century Scottish women politicians
Politicians from Glasgow
Scottish National Party councillors
Councillors in Renfrewshire
Scottish republicans
Women councillors in Scotland